George Bernard Moulson (6 August 1914 – 11 November 1994) was an Irish professional footballer.

He played three times for the Republic of Ireland national football team and also played at club level for Lincoln City, Grimsby Town and Peterborough United.

A goalkeeper, Moulson made his international debut in a 2–0 defeat to Portugal on 23 May 1948 in the Estádio da Luz, Lisbon.

Moulson played in the semi-final of the FA Cup on 25 March 1939, Wolverhampton Wanderers played Grimsby, in a FA Cup semi-final at Old Trafford. The attendance of 76,962 remains Old Trafford's largest ever attendance. The Mariners lost the game 5–0 after Moulson was injured early in the match. With the rules forbidding substitutes for injuries, Grimsby had to play with 10 men and an outfield player in goal.

References 

Republic of Ireland association footballers
Lincoln City F.C. players
Grimsby Town F.C. players
Peterborough United F.C. players
Ireland (FAI) international footballers
English Football League players
1914 births
1994 deaths
Association football goalkeepers
Republic of Ireland international footballers